This article lists the 25 oldest verified Edmontonians of all time (people from Edmonton, Alberta, all of whom attained the age of at least 105 years). Centenarians have received considerable local recognition in the City of Edmonton due to the Edmonton Aging Symposium, as well as the presence of the Alberta Centre on Aging at the University of Alberta. Edmonton's centenary focus is exemplified in the city's municipal slogan "Official Host City of the Turn of the Century" which was introduced in 1895, following the city's own centennial.

As of 2022, the oldest verified Edmontonian is Margherita Buttiri, who died at the age of 112 years and 46 days on 23 June 2020.

Municipal recognition 
The City of Edmonton honours citizens who become centenarians with a letter from the Mayor.

Oldest verified Edmontonians

See also 
 Demographics of Edmonton

References

External links 
Edmonton Aging Symposium
City of Edmonton Mayor's Office
Alberta Centre on Aging

Edmonton
Ageing
Edmonton